Benjamin "Ben" Hance  (born 25 July 2000) is an Australian Paralympic swimmer. At the 2020 Tokyo Paralympics, he won a gold and bronze medal.

Swimming career 
He is classified as a S14 swimmer. In 2021, Hance holds the world record for the Men's 100 m Backstroke (S14) by swimming a time of 58.88 (1019 points) at the 2021 Australian Multi-Class Swimming Championships .

At the 2020 Tokyo Paralympics, Hance won the gold medal in the Men's 100 m backstroke S14 with a personal best time of 57.73. He also won a bronze medal in the Men's 100 m butterfly S14 with a time of 56.90, less than 2 seconds behind the winner, Gabriel Bandeira from Brazil.

At the 2022 World Para Swimming Championships, Madeira, Hance won four medals - gold in the Men's 100m Backstroke S14, silver in Mixed 4 × 100 m freestyle relay S14 and Mixed 4 × 100 m medley relay S14 and bronze in the Men's 200 m Freestyle S14  In the medley he teamed up with Madeleine McTernan, Ricky Betar, and Ruby Storm. They won the silver medal with a time of 3:46.38, just under 6 seconds behind the winners, Great Britain, who set a world record. He did not medal in two other events.

At the 2022 Commonwealth Games, he won the silver medal in the 200 m freestyle S14. 

Hance is coached by Nathan Doyle at USC Spartans.

Recognition
 2021 - AIS Discovery of the Year at Swimming Australia Awards 
 2022 – Medal of the Order of Australia for service to sport as a gold medallist at the Tokyo Paralympic Games 2020

References

External links
 
 

2000 births
Living people
Male Paralympic swimmers of Australia
S14-classified Paralympic swimmers
Swimmers at the 2020 Summer Paralympics
Swimmers at the 2022 Commonwealth Games
Medalists at the 2020 Summer Paralympics
Paralympic gold medalists for Australia
Paralympic silver medalists for Australia
Paralympic bronze medalists for Australia
Paralympic medalists in swimming
Commonwealth Games silver medallists for Australia
Commonwealth Games medallists in swimming
Medalists at the World Para Swimming Championships
Recipients of the Medal of the Order of Australia
Australian male backstroke swimmers
Australian male butterfly swimmers
Australian male freestyle swimmers
21st-century Australian people
Medallists at the 2022 Commonwealth Games